Micropterix amsella is a species of moth belonging to the family Micropterigidae, first described by John Heath in 1975 and is endemic to Croatia.

References

External links
 Image

Micropterigidae
Endemic fauna of Croatia
Moths described in 1975
Moths of Europe
Taxa named by John Heath